Hugh Arthur Wardell-Yerburgh (11 January 1938 – 28 January 1970) was a British schoolmaster and rower. He won a silver medal in the coxless fours event at the 1964 Summer Olympics, together with John Russell, William Barry and John James.

Early life
Wardell-Yerburgh was the younger son of Geoffrey Bassett Wardell-Yerburgh, by his marriage in 1935 to Elizabeth Alis Georgina Kenyon, a daughter of G. L. T. Kenyon, a grandson of Lloyd Kenyon, 3rd Baron Kenyon. He had an older brother, Oswald Kenyon Wardell-Yerburgh (born 1936). They were grandsons of Oswald Wardell-Yerburgh (1858–1913).  

When Wardell-Yerburgh was a small boy, the family lived at Carlingford House, East Harptree, near to his grandmother, Edith Wardell-Yerburgh. On 15 February 1944, when he was six, his father died, leaving an estate valued at £27,227. He was brought up by his mother, who went to live at Meadow View, Westbury, Wiltshire. He was educated at Ravenscroft School, Eton College, and Bristol University, where he took a degree in aeronautical engineering. For his National Service, he served for eighteen months in the Royal Artillery.

Career
A successful oarsman at Eton and Bristol, in 1964 Wardell-Yerburgh rowed for Great Britain in the Coxless Fours at the 1964 Summer Olympics in Tokyo, gaining a Silver medal. From 1966 to 1968, he returned to Eton as a schoolmaster.

In 1968 he won the Diamond Challenge Sculls at Henley Royal Regatta. The same year, he joined Plessey as a Senior Radar Systems Analyst.

Private life
In 1966 Wardell-Yerburgh married Janet (Poppy) Bewley Cathie, an Olympic fencer. They had one daughter, Atlanta Jane Kenyon Wardell-Yerburgh, born in 1969, who was
educated at Worcester College, Oxford and became a chartered accountant.

Wardell-Yerburgh died in a traffic accident in 1970, aged only 32. He was then living at Mallards Reach, Ham Island, Old Windsor, and left an estate valued at £22,570.

References

1938 births
1970 deaths
British male rowers
Olympic rowers of Great Britain
Rowers at the 1964 Summer Olympics
Olympic silver medallists for Great Britain
Olympic medalists in rowing
Medalists at the 1964 Summer Olympics
People educated at Eton College
Teachers at Eton College
People educated at Ravenscroft School, Somerset
People from Westbury, Wiltshire
Road incident deaths in England